Tribal police can mean any of the following

 Aboriginal Police in Canada
 Indian tribal police of the United States
 Khasadars of Pakistan
 Dubas of the Northern Frontier District of Kenya